Makra is a Greek island in the Cyclades.

Cyclades
Islands of the South Aegean
Islands of Greece